In mathematics, a symmetric tensor is a tensor that is invariant under a permutation of its vector arguments:

for every permutation σ of the symbols   Alternatively, a symmetric tensor of order r represented in coordinates as a quantity with r indices satisfies

The space of symmetric tensors of order r on a finite-dimensional vector space V is naturally isomorphic to the dual of the space of homogeneous polynomials of degree r on V.  Over fields of characteristic zero, the graded vector space of all symmetric tensors can be naturally identified with the symmetric algebra on V. A related concept is that of the antisymmetric tensor or alternating form. Symmetric tensors occur widely in engineering, physics and mathematics.

Definition
Let V be a vector space and

a tensor of order k.  Then T is a symmetric tensor if

for the braiding maps associated to every permutation σ on the symbols {1,2,...,k} (or equivalently for every transposition on these symbols).

Given a basis {ei} of V, any symmetric tensor T of rank k can be written as

for some unique list of coefficients  (the components of the tensor in the basis) that are symmetric on the indices.  That is to say

for every permutation σ.

The space of all symmetric tensors of order k defined on V is often denoted by Sk(V) or Symk(V).  It is itself a vector space, and if V has dimension N then  the dimension of Symk(V) is the binomial coefficient

We then construct Sym(V) as the direct sum of Symk(V) for k = 0,1,2,...

Examples
There are many examples of symmetric tensors. Some include, the metric tensor, the Einstein tensor,  and the Ricci tensor, .

Many material properties and fields used in physics and engineering can be represented as symmetric tensor fields; for example: stress, strain, and anisotropic conductivity. Also, in diffusion MRI one often uses symmetric tensors to describe diffusion in the brain or other parts of the body.

Ellipsoids are examples of algebraic varieties; and so, for general rank,  symmetric tensors, in the guise of homogeneous polynomials, are used to define projective varieties, and are often studied as such.

Given a Riemannian manifold  equipped with its Levi-Civita connection , the covariant curvature tensor is a symmetric order 2 tensor over the vector space   of differential 2-forms. This corresponds to the fact that, viewing , we have the symmetry  between the first and second pairs of arguments in addition to antisymmetry within each pair: .

Symmetric part of a tensor
Suppose  is a vector space over a field of characteristic 0.

the summation extending over the symmetric group on k symbols.  In terms of a basis, and employing the Einstein summation convention, if

then

The components of the tensor appearing on the right are often denoted by

with parentheses around the indices being symmetrized. Square brackets [] are used to indicate anti-symmetrization.

Symmetric product
If T is a simple tensor, given as a pure tensor product

then the symmetric part of T is the symmetric product of the factors:

In general we can turn Sym(V) into an algebra by defining the commutative and associative product ⊙.

It can be verified (as is done by Kostrikin and Manin) that the resulting product is in fact commutative and associative. In some cases the operator is omitted: .

In some cases an exponential notation is used:

Where v is a vector.
Again, in some cases the ⊙ is left out:

Decomposition
In analogy with the theory of symmetric matrices, a (real) symmetric tensor of order 2 can be "diagonalized".  More precisely, for any tensor T ∈ Sym2(V), there is an integer r, non-zero unit vectors v1,...,vr ∈ V and weights λ1,...,λr such that

The minimum number r for which such a decomposition is possible is the (symmetric) rank of T.  The vectors appearing in this minimal expression are the principal axes of the tensor, and generally have an important physical meaning. For example, the principal axes of the inertia tensor define the Poinsot's ellipsoid representing the moment of inertia. Also see Sylvester's law of inertia.

For symmetric tensors of arbitrary order k, decompositions

are also possible. The minimum number r for which such a decomposition is possible is the symmetric rank of T. This minimal decomposition is called a Waring decomposition; it is a symmetric form of the tensor rank decomposition. For second-order tensors this corresponds to the rank of the matrix representing the tensor in any basis, and it is well known that the maximum rank is equal to the dimension of the underlying vector space. However, for higher orders this need not hold: the rank can be higher than the number of dimensions in the underlying vector space. Moreover, the rank and symmetric rank of a symmetric tensor may differ.

See also
 Antisymmetric tensor
 Ricci calculus
 Schur polynomial
 Symmetric polynomial
 Transpose
 Young symmetrizer

Notes

References
 .
 .
 .
 .

External links
 Cesar O. Aguilar, The Dimension of Symmetric k-tensors

Tensors